General O'Brien may refer to:

John O'Brien (Australian Army officer) (1908–1980), Australian Army major general
Maureen O'Brien (Irish Army general) (born 1960), Irish Army major general

See also
Attorney General O'Brien (disambiguation)